Caulerpa flexilis is a species of seaweed in the Caulerpaceae family.

The species is found around much of the Australian coast as well as in New Zealand. In Western Australia, it is found along the coast in a large area extending from around the Abrolhos Islands in the Mid West, south as far as Esperance in the Goldfields-Esperance region of Western Australia. In New Zealand it is found along the coast of Three Kings Island, the North Island and the northern parts of the South Island.

References

flexilis
Species described in 1813
Flora of Australasia